Goran Luković (Serbian Cyrillic: Горан Луковић; born 5 November 1978) is a Serbian former footballer.

External links
 
 Goran Luković at dekisa.tripod.com
 Goran Luković at srbijafudbal.net

1978 births
Living people
People from Gornji Milanovac
Serbian footballers
FK Metalac Gornji Milanovac players
FK Mladost Lučani players
FK Javor Ivanjica players
FK Železnik players
FK Napredak Kruševac players
Serbian First League players
Serbian SuperLiga players
Association football midfielders